This is a list of presidents of the Republic of the Congo since the formation of the post of president in 1960, to the present day.

A total of six people have served as President of the Republic of the Congo (not counting one acting/interim head of state and two collective presidencies). Additionally, one person, Denis Sassou Nguesso, has served on two non-consecutive occasions.

Key
Political parties

Other factions

Status

List of officeholders

Notes

Timeline

Latest election

See also

 Politics of the Republic of the Congo
 List of prime ministers of the Republic of the Congo
 Vice President of the Republic of the Congo

References

External links
World Statesmen (Congo-Brazzaville)

Republic of the Congo
Presidents
Presidents
Presidents
Presidents